William Robert (Billy) Haughton (November 23, 1923 – July 15, 1986) was an American harness driver and trainer. He was one of only three drivers to win the Hambletonian four times, the only one to win the Little Brown Jug five times, and the only one to win the Messenger Stakes seven times. With a career record of 4,910 wins and about $40 million in earnings, he was first in annual winnings 12 times – 1952–59, 1963, 1965, 1967, and 1968 – and in heats won from 1953 to 1958.

Early life and career
Born in Gloversville, New York, Haughton came from a farming background, where he competed in fairground races before coming into harness driving. In the early 1960s, he started developing a stable of his own. His best horses were Rum Customer that won the pacing Triple Crown in 1968, Green Speed that was named Harness Horse of the Year in 1977, and Nihilator that was named Harness Horse of the Year for 1985. With his Meadow Paige, Haughton paced a world record 1:55.2-minute mile in a time trial at Lexington in 1967.

Personal life and death
Haughton was married to Dorothy Bischoff, and together they had five children.

On July 15, 1986, Haughton died in Valhalla, New York, from head injuries sustained at Yonkers Raceway at the age of 62.

Haughton's son, Peter, who was also a driver, died in a car crash in 1980. His wife Dorothy died on March 31, 2019, at the age of 87 in Newfields, New Hampshire.

References

External links
 

1923 births
1986 deaths
People from Gloversville, New York
American harness racing drivers
American horse trainers
United States Harness Racing Hall of Fame inductees
Sports deaths in New York (state)